Egra subdivision is a subdivision of the Purba Medinipur district in the state of West Bengal, India.

Subdivisions
Purba Medinipur district is divided into the following administrative subdivisions:

Administrative units

Egra subdivision has 3 police stations, 5 community development blocks, 5 panchayat samitis, 42 gram panchayats, 708 mouzas, 682 inhabited villages, 1 municipality and 3 census towns. The municipality is: Egra. The census towns are: Amarshi Kasba, Benudia and Hincha Gerya. The subdivision has its headquarters at Egra.

Note: The map alongside presents some of the notable locations in the subdivision. All places marked in the map are linked in the larger full screen map.

Area
Egra subdivision has an area of 940.96  km2, population in 2011 of 958,939 and density of population of 1,019 per km2. 18.82%  of the population of the district resides in this subdivision.

Police stations
Police stations in Egra subdivision have the following features and jurisdiction:

*The data for area is as per the website of Purba Medinipur Police, but it appears that it has not been updated for a long time.

Blocks
Community development blocks in Egra subdivision are:

Gram Panchayats

The subdivision contains 42 gram panchayats under 5 community development blocks:

 Bhagabanpur I block: Benodia, Gurgram, Kalaberia, Shimulia, Bhagwanpur, Kajlagarh, Mahammadpur–I, Bivisanpur, Kakra and Mahammadpur–II.
 Egra I Barida, Jumki, Rishi Bankimchandra, Chatri, Kasba–Egra, Jerthan, Panchrol and Saharha.
 Egra II block: Basudevpur, Bibekananda, Dubda, Paniparul, Bathuari, Deshbandhu, Manjusree and Sarbaday.
 Patashpur I block: Amarshi–I, Brajalalpur, Gokulpur, Amarshi–II, Chistipur–I, Gopalpur, Barhat, Chistipur–II and Naipur.
 Patashpur II block: Argoyal, Mathura, Pataspur, Sreerampur, Khargram, Panchet and South Khanda.

Education
With a literacy rate of 87.66% Purba Medinipur district ranked first amongst all districts of West Bengal in literacy as per the provisional figures of the census of India 2011. Within Purba Medinipur district, Tamluk subdivision had a literacy rate of 85.98%, Haldia subdivision 86.67%, Egra subdivision 86.18% and Contai subdivision 89.19%. All CD Blocks and municipalities in the district had literacy levels above 80%.

Given in the table below (data in numbers) is a comprehensive picture of the education scenario in Purba Medinipur district for the year 2013-14.

Note: Primary schools include junior basic schools; middle schools, high schools and higher secondary schools include madrasahs; technical schools include junior technical schools, junior government polytechnics, industrial technical institutes, industrial training centres, nursing training institutes etc.; technical and professional colleges include engineering colleges, polytechnics, medical colleges, para-medical institutes, management colleges, teachers training and nursing training colleges, law colleges, art colleges, music colleges etc. Special and non-formal education centres include sishu siksha kendras, madhyamik siksha kendras, centres of Rabindra mukta vidyalaya, recognised Sanskrit tols, institutions for the blind and other handicapped persons, Anganwadi centres, reformatory schools etc.

The following institutions are located in Egra subdivision:
 Egra Sarada Shashi Bhusan College was established at Egra in 1968. It is affiliated to Vidyasagar University and offers undergraduate courses in arts, science and commerce, It has hostel facilities.
Bajkul Milani Mahavidyalaya was established at Tethi Bari mouza, PO Kismat Bajkul, in 1964. It is affiliated to Vidyasagar University.
Yogoda Satsanga Palpara Mahavidyalaya was established in 1964 at Palpara. It offers undergraduate, as well as B.Ed. and M.Ed. courses,

Healthcare
The table below (all data in numbers) presents an overview of the medical facilities available and patients treated in the hospitals, health centres and sub-centres in 2014 in Purba Medinipur district.  
 

Medical facilities available in Egra subdivision are as follows:

Hospitals: (Name, location, beds) 
Egra Subdivision Hospital, Egra, 68 beds
Rural Hospitals: (Name, CD block, location, beds)
Bhagabanpur Rural Hospital, Bhagabanpur I CD block, Bhagabanpur, 30 beds
Gangadharbar Rural Hospital, Egra II CD block, Gangadharbar, PO Pirijkhanbar, 30 beds
Patashpur Rural Hospital, Patashpur II CD block, Patashpur, 30 beds
Block Primary Health Centre: (Name, block, location, beds)
Gonara BPHC, Patashpur I CD Block, Golara Nij, PO Manglamaro, 10 beds
Ramchandrapur BPHC, Egra I CD Block, Ramchandrapur,  PO Kharbandhi, 10 beds
Primary Health Centres: (CD block-wise)(CD block, PHC location, beds)
Egra I CD block: Chatla (2), Kasabagola, PO Panchrol (2)
Egra II CD block: Paniparul (10), Betamaheshpur, PO Maheshpur (10), Shyampur, PO Bidurpur (2)
Patashpur I CD block: Borhat, PO Katranka (6)
Patashpur II CD block: Pratapdighi (10), Argoal (10)
Bhagabanpur I CD block: Bibhisanpur (10), Kajalgarh (6), Seulipur, PO Paschimbarh (6)

Electoral constituencies
Lok Sabha (parliamentary) and Vidhan Sabha (state assembly) constituencies in Purba Medinipur district were as follows:

References

Subdivisions of West Bengal
Subdivisions in Purba Medinipur district
Purba Medinipur district